Morrison High School is a public secondary school in Morrison, Oklahoma, United States. It is located at 2nd & C Street in Morrison, Oklahoma and the only high school in Morrison Public Schools.

Extracurricular activities

Clubs and organizations

4-H
FCA
FFA
National Honor Society
Quiz Bowl
Student Council
SWAT
Yearbook

Athletics
Basketball
Baseball
Cheerleading
Football
Softball - Slow Pitch
Softball - Fast Pitch
Track
Wrestling

References

External links
 

Public high schools in Oklahoma
Schools in Noble County, Oklahoma